The Elwha River Bridge was built around 1913 to span the Elwha River, Washington.  The bridge was closed and then demolished in late 2007 due to concerns regarding its structure after the I-35W Mississippi River bridge collapse.  A new two lane bridge has been constructed with a pedestrian and bicyclist trail underneath.  This is to become a vital link in the Olympic Discovery Trail.  The bridge construction was completed in late 2009.

The bridge was added to the National Register of Historic Places in 1982.

Notes

References

Road bridges on the National Register of Historic Places in Washington (state)
Bridges completed in 1913
Demolished bridges in the United States
Bridges in Clallam County, Washington
1913 establishments in Washington (state)
National Register of Historic Places in Clallam County, Washington
Concrete bridges in the United States
Box girder bridges in the United States